Christina Elizabeth Sharpe is an American academic who is a professor of English literature and Black Studies at York University in Toronto, Canada.

Education 
Sharpe received a bachelor's degree in English and Africana studies from the University of Pennsylvania in 1987, having studied abroad at the University of Ibadan in Nigeria. She completed a master's degree and a doctorate at Cornell University; her dissertation was on African writer Bessie Head.

Career and research
Her academic research focuses on Black visual studies, Black queer studies, and mid-nineteenth century to contemporary African-American Literature and Culture.

Employment 
Sharpe was employed at Hobart and William Smiths Colleges from 1996 to 1998. From 1998 until 2018 she held various positions at Tufts University. Awarded tenure in 2005, Sharpe became a full professor in 2017.

At York University since 2018, she is currently a professor in the department of humanities in the Black Canadian Studies certificate program.

She is the author of the books In the Wake: On Blackness and Being and Monstrous Intimacies: Making Post-Slavery Subjects. Her forthcoming publications include a critical introduction to Nomenclature: New and Collected Poems of Dionne Brand (1982–2010) as well as a monograph: Black. Still. Life.

Monstrous Intimacies (2010) 
In Monstrous Intimacies, Christina Sharpe concerns herself with these sexual-racial economies and the "monstrous intimacies" that percolate within in, which she describes as "a set of known and unknown performances and inhabited horrors, desires and positions produced, reproduced, circulated, and transmitted, that are breathed in like air and often unacknowledged to be monstrous" (3). Sharpe's articulation is contingent upon an oppositional knowledge that holds in tension freedom and subjection, love and hate; indulging in a "diasporic study" that attempts a "complex articulation" of the sexual economies of slavery to denote how power is constructed at the site of the interpersonal and the intimate. Foregrounding Douglass' primal scene as a scene of subjectivation and objectivation and, later, locating the primality in James Henry Hammond's letters and, later still, Jones' text, Sharpe provides an account of its "psychic and material reach" and its subsequent (re)performances of a double/dubbed birth within sites of monstrous intimacies — the blood-stained gate and the Door.

In the Wake: On Blackness and Being (2016)
Her second book, In the Wake on Blackness and Being, was published in 2016 by Duke University Press, whose website offers this overview:

"In this original and trenchant work, Christina Sharpe interrogates literary, visual, cinematic, and quotidian representations of Black life that comprise what she calls the 'orthography of the wake.' Activating multiple registers of 'wake'—the path behind a ship, keeping watch with the dead, coming to consciousness—Sharpe illustrates how Black lives are swept up and animated by the afterlives of slavery, and she delineates what survives despite such insistent violence and negation. Initiating and describing a theory and method of reading the metaphors and materiality of 'the wake,' 'the ship,' 'the hold,' and 'the weather,' Sharpe shows how the sign of the slave ship marks and haunts contemporary Black life in the diaspora and how the specter of the hold produces conditions of containment, regulation, and punishment, but also something in excess of them. In the weather, Sharpe situates anti-Blackness and white supremacy as the total climate that produces premature Black death as normative. Formulating the wake and "wake work" as sites of artistic production, resistance, consciousness, and possibility for living in diaspora, In the Wake offers a way forward."

Awards 

 In the Wake:
Finalist, 2017 Hurston/Wright Legacy Award in Nonfiction
The Guardian, "Best Books of 2016"
The Walrus, "Best Books of 2016"

Works (selection)
 In the Wake: On Blackness and Being. Durham, N.C.: Duke University Press, 2016.
 Monstrous Intimacies: Making Post-Slavery Subjects. Durham, N.C.: Duke University Press, 2010.

References

External links
 

Black studies scholars
African-American academics
Cornell University alumni
Academic staff of York University
University of Pennsylvania alumni
Tufts University faculty
Year of birth missing (living people)
Living people
African-American women academics
American women academics
21st-century African-American people
21st-century African-American women